Angela Oforiwa Alorwu-Tay is a Ghanaian politician and member of the Seventh Parliament of the Fourth Republic of Ghana representing the Afadjato South Constituency in the Volta Region on the ticket of the National Democratic Congress (Ghana). She was one of the five women elected out of nine that contested during the 2016 general elections in the Volta Region.

Education 
She has a (Hons) BA from University of Ghana, a diploma from West Africa Computer Science Institute and has a GCE O'level from Nkonya Secondary School. She also has an MA degree in Democracy, Governance, Law & Development from the University of Cape Coast.

Religion 
Angela is a Christian.

Personal life 
Angela Alorwu Tay was born on 16 April 1971. She is widowed with two children.

Politics 
In 2015, she contested and won th NDC parliamentary seat for the Afadjato South Constituency in the Volta Region and polled 5,138 votes to beat Mr Reuben Kornu with 1,419 votes, Miss Kafui Takyi −1,366 votes, Mr Eben Kay Hodo – 820 votes, Mr Victus Agbesi with 577 votes and Miss Susie Adoboe with 559 votes. She also advocates for the gender parity issue Ghana is facing and holds the current government of Ghana to redeem his campaign promise of 30% women in his cabinet.

Employment 
She served as a secretary Unique Insurance CO. between the period of 1999 to 2003. She also served as a Manager at Tahnaf Service between 2004 and 2012. She added on as a District Chief Executive from 2012 to 2016.

References 

1971 births
Living people
National Democratic Congress (Ghana) politicians
Ghanaian MPs 2013–2017
Ghanaian MPs 2017–2021
University of Ghana alumni
University of Cape Coast alumni
Ghanaian MPs 2021–2025